Merseyrail is a commuter rail network serving the Liverpool City Region and adjacent areas of Cheshire and Lancashire. Merseyrail operates 66 railway stations across two lines – the Northern Line and Wirral Line, which are dedicated  electrified lines converging into rapid transit-style underground sections in the centres of Liverpool and Birkenhead. Merseyrail branding is also applied to stations and ticketing on the City Line, which are within the Liverpool City Region but operated by other train operating companies, predominantly Northern Trains. The City Line services operate on the Liverpool to Manchester Lines and the Liverpool to Wigan Line using a mix of AC electric and diesel trains.

Prior to the COVID-19 pandemic in the United Kingdom, the network carried 31million passengers per year.

The first part of the urban network was opened in 1977 by merging separate rail lines by constructing new tunnels under Liverpool city centre and Birkenhead. The full 1970s plans for the network were not realised, but the network has been extended on its peripheries with additional peripheral extensions proposed. The extensions were created by electrifying existing lines and then transferring the electrified sections into Merseyrail.

Merseyrail is operated for Merseytravel by 50:50 joint venture Serco-Abellio, who superseded Arriva Trains Merseyside in 2003. The 25-year contract expires in 2028, with the aspiration of the Liverpool City Region government being to bring the network and its infrastructure under local public ownership. , Serco-Abellio operates a fleet of 59 trains and employs 1,148 people.

The first units of all-new  rolling stock entered into service on the Merseyrail network on 23 January 2023.

Network

The self-contained network is operated by the Merseyrail train operating company, formally known as Merseyrail Electrics 2002, a 50:50 Serco-Abellio joint venture. Two lines known as the Northern Line and the Wirral Line compose the electric third-rail part of the network, which has service frequencies of 15minutes in outlying areas converging to rapid transit frequencies in central sections. The lines are electrified throughout using a  system. The City Line (marked red on the map) is operated primarily by Northern with funding from Merseytravel. The line is mainly electrified with one branch, the Liverpool to Manchester line via Warrington, operated by diesel trains.

Trains on the Northern Line and Wirral Line cover the Liverpool City Region. The lines connect Liverpool city centre with cities and towns on the outer reaches of the city region, such as Southport, Chester and Ormskirk. Frequent intermediate stops serve other sections of the urban area.

Unlike similar networks in the UK, Merseyrail infrastructure is owned and maintained at a national level by Network Rail. As a self-contained system serving a single City Region, the Northern and Wirral Lines are exempt from the national rail franchising structure, which is instead the responsibility of local government. The City Line, which shares infrastructure with regional and high-speed services and trains with neighbouring mainline commuter services (particularly that of Manchester), is not part of this exemption.

The three lines interchange as follows:
 Northern and City Line services interchange at Liverpool South Parkway and Hunts Cross in the south of the city.
 Wirral and City Lines interchange at Lime Street in the city centre.
 Northern and Wirral Lines interchange at Liverpool Central and Moorfields in the city centre.

Northern Line

The Northern Line is shown in blue on the Merseyrail and Merseytravel maps and denoted by the above wordmark on underground stations. Each route operates a train every 15minutes from Monday to Saturday, giving a frequent interval between trains on the central section. Some additional trains run at peak hours on the Southport line.

On matchdays at Everton F.C.'s Goodison Park and Liverpool F.C.'s Anfield, Northern Line services connect with the SoccerBus service at Sandhills station to transport fans to the stadia. Bus departure is at frequent intervals from Sandhills station with ticketing to combine both modes of travel. Kirkdale station is within walking distance of Goodison Park.

Connections to non-Merseyrail services are available at:

Wirral Line

The Wirral Line is shown in green on the Merseyrail and Merseytravel maps and denoted by the above wordmark on underground stations. Each service from one of these the terminus stations runs through  underground station in Birkenhead, then through the Mersey Railway Tunnel, continuing around the single track underground loop tunnel under Liverpool's city centre. Trains head back into the Mersey Railway Tunnel to return to one of the four terminus stations.

Monday-Saturday services are every 15minutes to/from Liverpool to Chester, New Brighton and West Kirby, and every 30minutes to/from Ellesmere Port (Monday–Sunday). These combine to give a service at least every five minutes from Birkenhead Hamilton Square and around the loop under Liverpool's city centre.

Connections to non-Merseyrail services are available at:
  on the West Kirby branch for the Borderlands Line to Wrexham, operated by Transport for Wales;
  for an infrequent service to and from Warrington.
 Liverpool Lime Street for intercity and regional trains to London Euston, Manchester, Birmingham, Wigan, Scotland, the Midlands and Wales.

City Line

The City Line is the brand name used by Merseytravel on suburban rail services in the Liverpool City Region, starting eastwards from the mainline platforms of Liverpool Lime Street railway station. The line is depicted on Merseytravel signage and maps using the colour red and the above word mark.

Unlike the other two lines, the City Line is not operated by the train operating company Merseyrail, however most of the line's stations within the Liverpool City Region use Merseytravel's Merseyrail yellow branding, signage and ticketing.

The term covers most of the Liverpool City Region sections of the Crewe–Liverpool line, the two Liverpool–Manchester lines and the Liverpool–Wigan line, with services continuing to Warrington, Chester via Runcorn and Blackpool and Preston via Wigan. Two services are not electrified, the Manchester via Warrington Central and Chester via Runcorn.

It is mainly operated by Northern Trains, with additional long-distance services operated by TransPennine Express, Avanti West Coast, East Midlands Railway, Transport for Wales and West Midlands Trains.

Services

Point-to-point or return tickets are purchased from staffed offices or ticket machines, but the system is tightly integrated with Merseytravel's City Region-wide pass system, which also encompasses the Mersey Ferries and city and regional bus networks. Merseytravel's smart ticketing is via the local MetroCard smartcard system, including Merseyrail travel.

Typical weekday off-peak service on the Merseyrail-run Northern and Wirral Lines, is as follows:

Fleet

Current fleet 
Services on the electrified Merseyrail network are operated by British Rail Class 507 and Class 508 electric multiple unit trains (EMUs). These replaced pre-war Class 502 (originally constructed by the LMS) and similar Class 503 EMUs. There are 57 trains in service on the network. This is down from an initial 76: twelve 508s were transferred to Connex South Eastern in 1996, and a further three were transferred to Silverlink to supplement its fleet of Class 313 EMUs in North London. These train sets had been stored on Merseyside as surplus from the 1990s.

Three sets have been written off and scrapped. These are unit 507022 in 1991, after a collision; unit 508118, which had been gutted by fire in an arson attack in Birkenhead in 2001; and unit 507006, which was written off after a crash at Kirkby in March 2021.

The fleet was refurbished between 2002 and 2005 by Alstom at a cost of £32million, involving trainsets being transported to and from Eastleigh works behind Class 67 locomotives. Improvements to the trains included new high-backed seating, interior panel replacement, new lighting, the installation of a Passenger Information System and a new external livery.

On 28 January 2020, Swiss rolling-stock manufacturer Stadler Rail provided the first of a new fleet of 53 new train sets, designated , built at Stadler's factory in Bussnang, Switzerland. The final units were due to enter service in 2021. The trains are based on the METRO platform, Stadler's product family for underground trains also used on the Berlin U-Bahn and the Minsk Metro. The new trains are a custom-built, bespoke design specifically for the Merseyrail network, with driver only and guard capability. This differs from the previous fleet, which was built to a standard British Rail design for commuter services.

The new trains have an articulated four-car design, compared to the previous three-car units, with a significantly increased overall capacity and faster acceleration and deceleration, which gives reduced journey times. A combination of reduced weight of 99tonnes, representing a 5.5tonne weight reduction, and more efficient electrical systems will give a 20% reduction in energy use.

, all trains are only equipped for  operation, along with a smaller battery for depot shunting.

The National Union of Rail, Maritime and Transport Workers opposed driver-only operation on the new fleet, which they said would put passenger safety and security at risk. Following a period of strike action, an agreement was reached to guarantee a guard on every train.

Merseytravel has an option for a further 60 Class 777 units as part of the contract, which if exercised would see a total of 113 trains built if services are extended to new destinations such as Helsby, Skelmersdale or Wrexham. The deal also involves the transfer of 155 of Merseyrail's maintenance workers and the operation of its maintenance depot at Kirkdale to Stadler Rail Service. The transfer of Kirkdale depot and Merseyrail engineering personnel took place in October 2017, as construction work to modernise the depot, which is the planned maintenance hub for the Class 777s, commenced.

The first Class 777 unit entered into service on the Northern Line on 23 January 2023. 
Initially they are being used on the Kirkby route, followed by the Ormskirk route.
The remaining units will be deployed to the rest of the Northern Line and the Wirral Line later in 2023.

Future fleet

Battery trains
The Class 777 trains are capable of being propelled via onboard battery sets. The battery set per car can be up to 5tonnes in weight. The batteries can be charged via a rail terminal charger and while operating on electrified tracks. When the Headbolt Lane extension was unveiled to the public, it was also announced that the original order of 52 units was increased to 53 to allow for some units to undergo battery trials.

Following on from the trial, it was announced in July 2021 that the units tested had been able to travel up to  without the need for recharging. The Liverpool City Region Combined Authority stated that the battery-powered trains will run to the new Headbolt Lane station at Kirkby which is due to open in 2023. The technology opens up the possibility of the trains being able to serve on routes to destinations such as Wrexham, Preston, Wigan and Warrington.

Past fleet

The original service on the Merseyrail lines was provided by Class 502s on the Northern Line and Class 503s on the Wirral Line. The former was withdrawn by 1980 and the latter by 1985. Although the withdrawal of the Class 503s began in June 1980, the majority of the Class 503s were progressively withdrawn from June 1984, with the final service train running on 29 March 1985.

Depots

The electric fleet is maintained and stabled at Stadler's maintenance depot and United Kingdom headquarters at Kirkdale and Birkenhead North TMD. Minor repair work and train cleaning is undertaken at Kirkdale, while overhauls are completed at Birkenhead. The roles will be reversed once the Class 777 trains fully replace the existing fleet. Other depots at Hall Road and Birkenhead Central were closed in 1997, and the former was demolished in April 2009. The Birkenhead Central depot is proposed for reopening.

There are also two depots near Southport station: Southport Wall Sidings and Southport Carriage Holding Sidings.

Franchise and concession history
As a result of the privatisation of British Rail, the Northern Line and Wirral Line were brought together as the Mersey Rail Electrics passenger franchise, being sold on 19 January 1997. Although franchises are awarded and administered on a national level (initially through various independent bodies, and later the Department of Transport directly), under the original privatisation legislation of 1993, passenger transport executives (PTEs) were co-signatories of franchise agreements covering their areas – this role being later modified by the Railways Act 2005.

The first train operating company awarded the Mersey Rail Electrics franchise contract was MTL. MTL was originally the operating arm of Merseytravel but had been privatised in 1985. The brand name Merseyrail Electrics was adopted by MTL.

The Merseyrail name became the official brand for the network in the days of British Rail, surviving several franchise holders, although the name was not used by Arriva when holding the franchise. Despite this, Merseytravel continued the Merseyrail branding at stations, allowing the name to be adopted colloquially. With acquisition by Arriva, the train operating company was rebranded Arriva Trains Merseyside from 27 April 2001. Merseyrail is referred to as "Merseyrail Electrics" by National Rail Enquiries, and as "Serco/Abellio Merseyrail" by Merseytravel.

The City Line was also privatised under the 1993 Act, but as part of a different, much larger North West Regional Railways (NWRR) franchise. Upon sale on 2 March 1997, the first train operating company awarded the NWRR franchise contract was North Western Trains (owned by Great Western Holdings). The train operating company was later bought by FirstGroup and rebranded First North Western.

The third-rail electric Northern and Wirral Lines were largely isolated from the rest of the National Rail network with no through passenger services to or from outside the third-rail Merseyrail network. A decision was to transfer the network into exclusive Merseytravel control, being removed from the national franchising system. The Secretary of State exempted the two lines from being designated as a national railway franchise under the 1993 Act.

When the Mersey Rail Electrics franchise was due for renewal, coming into force on 20 July 2003, Merseytravel contracted the operation of the two lines with a concession extending for up to 25years. The first successful bidder was Merseyrail Electrics (2002) Ltd, a joint venture between Serco and NedRailways (renamed Abellio in 2009).

The City Line, which was largely diesel-operated at the time, was not included in 2003 franchise, continuing as a part of the nationally administered rail franchise system. From 11 December 2004, the NWRR franchise was merged into a new Northern franchise. The first train operating company awarded this franchise contract was Northern Rail, also owned by a Serco-NedRail (Abellio) joint venture. This franchise passed to Arriva Rail North on 1 April 2016 and then to Northern Trains on 1 March 2020.

Due to the isolation of the Northern and Wirral Lines, Merseyrail Electrics (2002) Ltd are keen to adopt vertical integration – taking responsibility for maintenance of the track from Network Rail. The current managing director of Merseyrail is Andy Heath.

Performance

Operating as a self-contained network means there are relatively few problems because there is little conflict with other train operating companies. Merseyrail has publicly committed to aiming to be the best train operating company in the United Kingdom.

In February 2010, Merseyrail was named the most reliable operator of trains in the United Kingdom, with a reliability average of 96.33% during 2009–2010, the highest ever achieved by any United Kingdom train operator.

Enforcement of by-laws
Merseyrail employs a team of officers who enforce railway by-laws relating to placing feet on seats, travelling without tickets, and other kinds of anti-social behaviour. The enforcement of the 'feet on seat' by-law by Merseyrail was judged to be "draconian" in September 2007. However, Merseyrail stated that it did not want to take offenders to court, but was not allowed to fine offenders otherwise (unlike people who smoke on trains or station platforms). Merseyrail claimed its stance was popular with commuters and has reduced anti-social behaviour on the system.

History

Collection of separate railways

The present Merseyrail system was merged from the lines of five former pre-Grouping rail systems:
 The Mersey Railway (Liverpool Central to Rock Ferry, Birkenhead Park)
 The Cheshire Lines Committee railway (Liverpool Central to Hunts Cross section).
 The Lancashire and Yorkshire Railway (Liverpool Exchange to Kirkby, Ormskirk and Southport sections).
 The Wirral Railway (Birkenhead Park to New Brighton and West Kirby)
 The Birkenhead Joint Railway (Rock Ferry to Hooton and Chester section and the Ellesmere Port branch).

The Mersey Railway was electrified in 1903 being the world's first full electrification of a steam railway. This was followed by the separate Lancashire and Yorkshire Railway line from Liverpool Exchange to Southport, which was electrified in 1906. The electrification of the former Wirral Railway lines to New Brighton and West Kirby took place in 1937 and allowed through running into Liverpool via the Mersey Railway tunnel.

Creation of Merseyrail

Riverside terminal station at the Pier Head later closed due to the demise of the trans-Atlantic liner trade in 1971. The Beeching Report recommended that the mostly-electrified suburban and outer-suburban commuter rail services into Exchange and Central High-level stations from the north and south of the city be terminated. Long and medium-distance routes would be concentrated on one mainline terminal station at Lime Street station serving Liverpool, the Wirral and beyond.

Liverpool City Council took a different view, proposing the retention of the suburban services and integrating them into a regional electrified rapid-transit network by linking all lines via new tunnels under the centres of Liverpool and Birkenhead. As well as ease of transport around most of Merseyside, the proposed network would offer all urban line areas ease of access to the remaining mainline station at Liverpool Lime Street and divert urban routes from the mainline terminus station to underground rail in Liverpool's centre; this would release platforms from urban use, leaving the mainline station to focus on mid- to long-haul routes. This approach was supported by the Merseyside Area Land Use and Transportation Study (the MALTS report). Merseyrail was born when Liverpool City Council's proposal was adopted. However, not all of the electrified sections were saved; as part of the Beeching cuts, the Southport to Preston line was to be axed, and rather than keeping the electrified section between Southport and Crossens it was closed in 1964.

The Merseyside Passenger Transport Authority, later named Merseytravel, was formed in 1969 with representatives from all local authorities, taking responsibility for the local rail lines identified to be incorporated into the new network, known as 'Merseyrail'. At that time, the lines out of Liverpool Exchange, Liverpool Central Low Level, Liverpool Central High Level and Liverpool Lime Street stations were separate. The existing electric and diesel hauled lines identified to become the new Merseyrail lines, the first stage of Merseyrail's creation, were named the 'Northern Line' (from Exchange and Central High Level), 'Wirral Line' (from Central Low Level) and 'City Line' (from Lime Street station) respectively.

The Strategic Plan for the North West (SPNW) in 1973 envisaged that the Outer Loop, the Edge Hill Spur connecting the east of the city to the central underground sections, and the lines to St. Helens, Wigan and Warrington would be electrified and all integrated into Merseyrail by 1991.

To create the comprehensive rapid-transit network, four construction projects needed completion:
 Loop Line; a tunnel extending the Wirral lines in a loop around Liverpool's city centre, creating the Wirral Line.
 Link Line; a tunnel linking the lines north and south radiating out from under Liverpool city centre to be named the Northern Line.
 Edge Hill Spur; by reusing the 1830 Wapping Tunnel, recently closed in 1972, from Edge Hill junction in the east to Central Station, enabling eastern lines to access the underground city centre section.
 Outer Rail Loop; effectively a rail loop around the outer suburbs of the city and city centre using existing lines. The Northern Line would form the western section through the city centre. The loop would also be split into two loops, one north and one south of Liverpool's city centre, heading for the city centre's Central Station from Broad Green in the east via the Edge Hill Junction. A part of the scheme would be the construction of a six platform underground station at Broad Green where the two loops and the St.Helens/Wigan line met.
Only the first two projects were constructed, creating the fully electrified third rail Northern and Wirral Lines. The last two were cancelled late in the project after some works had actually started. This isolated the City Line, preventing its full integration into the network: local services still entered the mainline Lime Street station, occupying platforms that could have been used for long-haul routes. In the decades following the commissioning of the resulting cut-down rapid-transit network, political moves were made to complete the full project, to fully incorporate the City Line into the network; but to no avail. Until the 2015 electrification of the Lime Street to Manchester and Wigan lines, the City Line remained 100% diesel hauled, with the Lime Street to Warrington line still retaining diesel traction. Since its creation Merseytravel has sponsored the use of Merseyrail branding in stations and paid British Rail to brand local services in a Merseyrail livery. This livery sponsorship ended with the privatisation of British Rail when operators adopted their own corporate train liveries.

The Loop and Link Project

The major engineering works required to create the Northern and Wirral lines became known as the 'Loop' and 'Link' Project, consisting of two tunnels. The 'Loop' was the Wirral Line tunnel and the 'Link' the Northern Line tunnel, both under Liverpool's city centre. The main works were undertaken between 1972 and 1977. A further project, known as the Edge Hill Spur, would have integrated the City Lines into the city centre underground network. This would have meshed the eastern section of the city into the core underground city centre section of the electric network, releasing platforms at mainline Lime Street station for mid to long haul routes. The Edge Hill Spur was not completed due to budget cuts.

The Loop Line (Wirral Line)
The Loop Line is a single-track loop tunnel under Liverpool's city centre serving the Wirral Line branches. It was built to allow both greater capacity and a wider choice of destinations for Wirral Line users, which included the business and shopping districts of Liverpool city centre and the mainline Lime Street station. The loop extension offered direct mainline station access to Wirral residents after the decommissioning of the mainline Woodside terminal station in Birkenhead.

Trains from Wirral arriving via the original Mersey Railway tunnel enter the loop beneath Mann Island in Liverpool continuing in a clockwise direction through James Street, Lime Street and Central, returning to the Wirral via James Street station. The loop tunnel gave interchanges for passengers of the Wirral Line to the Northern Line at Moorfields and Central stations.

The Link Line (Northern Line)
 
The purpose of the Link Tunnel was to link the separate urban lines north and south of the city creating a continuous north–south crossrail, called the Northern Line. A substantial section of the Northern Line had an additional function in completing the western section of a planned double-track electrified suburban orbital line, circling the city's outer suburbs, known as the 'Outer Rail Loop'. However, the eastern section of the Outer Rail Loop was never built due to budget cuts.

The Link Line tunnel is a double-track tunnel that links two lines: One line running south from the city centre to Hunts Cross; another running north from the city centre to Southport, with branches to Ormskirk and Kirkby. One continuous line would be created, the Northern Line. The line provides direct access from the north and south of Liverpool to the shopping and business districts in the city centre via two underground stations, Liverpool Central and Moorfields, both of which also interchange with the Loop Line, which is an extension of the Wirral Line. The Northern Line effectively creates a north–south crossrail enabling passengers to travel from the south to the north of the city, and vice versa, via Liverpool city centre.

The present Northern Line underground station at Liverpool Central was originally the Mersey Railway terminus at Liverpool Central Low Level. A section of the original 1880s tunnel between James Street and Central stations was used to form the Link Tunnel. The remainder, between Paradise Street Junction and Derby Square Junction, was retained for use as a rolling stock interchange line between the Northern and Wirral Lines and also for a reversing siding for Wirral Line trains terminating at James Street when the Loop Tunnel is inoperative. The rolling stock interchange section of the tunnel is not used for passenger traffic.

Hamilton Square Burrowing Junction
A burrowing junction was constructed at Birkenhead Hamilton Square station, to increase traffic capacity on the Wirral Line by eliminating the flat junction to the west of the station. This included a new station tunnel at Hamilton Square to serve the lines to New Brighton and West Kirby.

Liverpool Central South Junction
To the south of Liverpool Central Low Level Station, a new track layout was constructed as part of the Link Line project. This layout permitted the former Mersey Railway route from the north, to be connected to the former Cheshire Lines Committee route running south from the closed Central High Level Station, allowing the Northern Line to be extended in a southerly direction to Garston and, later, Hunts Cross. It was accomplished by excavating the trackbed of the high-level tunnel to connect to the lower level tunnel of the two routes by means of a tunnelled gradient. As it was still necessary to accommodate a reversing siding to serve Central Low Level, and as the width of the high-level tunnel did not permit a three-track alignment, a new section of single-track tunnel was built for the Central to Garston line. This tunnel starts to the south of the station and rises to join the high-level tunnel.

At the time of construction, the opportunity was taken to construct two short header tunnels for the proposed Edge Hill Spur project (see below). Should the project go ahead, the connecting tunnels could be constructed without the need to obstruct rail services on the existing route. The junction arrangement would be a burrowing junction, as at Hamilton Square (see above), with the grade separation of tracks increasing capacity.

Expanding the network (1977 – present)

The Loop and Link project was followed by a programme of expansion, electrification and new stations, which built on the greater integration and capacity provided by the new infrastructure.

Walton to Kirkby
On 30 April 1977,  terminus station was closed as a part of the Link tunnel project to create the electrified Merseyrail north-south crossrail line named the Northern Line. Liverpool Exchange was the terminus of the northern Liverpool to Manchester route to Manchester Victoria via Wigan Wallgate station.

A tunnel under Liverpool's city centre, the Link tunnel, created the through crossrail Northern Line. The nearby Moorfields underground through station located on the new Link tunnel, serving the Northern and Wirral Lines, replaced Liverpool Exchange terminus station. Since diesel trains could not operate in the underground stations and tunnels for safety reasons, trains that had terminated at Liverpool Exchange terminus from Wigan Wallgate were terminated at Sandhills station as a temporary measure, which is the last surface station before the tunnel.

A year later in 1978, the short line electrification from Walton to Kirkby extended the Merseyrail network, creating a Northern Line branch terminus and interchange station at Kirkby. The line was electrified using the standard 750 V DC third rail Merseyrail system. The northern Liverpool to Manchester route was cut into two with differing modes of traction, electric and diesel. The diesel Wigan service terminating at Sandhills station was cut back to Kirkby. The Merseyrail electric and the Northern Rail diesel services use opposite ends of the same platform at Kirkby. Merseyrail and Northern Rail trains are generally timed to meet for ease of interchange.

Liverpool Central to Garston
In 1978 the Northern Line was extended south from Liverpool Central to Garston. This was made possible by inclining the tunnel into Central High Level from Garston to run down into the lower level tunnel entering Central Low Level from the opposite end of the station forming one continuous tunnel. The linking of the two tunnels had been envisaged when the Mersey Railway was extended to Central from James Street in the 1890s, with the Mersey Railway ensuring the two tunnels were on the same alignment.

The diesel-hauled line from Liverpool Central High Level to Gateacre in the south of the city had been abandoned in 1972. On reopening under the Merseyrail brand, the electrified line never reached Gateacre as it once did, terminating three stations towards the city centre at Garston.

Garston to Hunts Cross
This short extension of electrified Merseyrail line at the southern end of the Northern Line opened in 1983. It facilitated passenger interchanging between the Merseyrail Northern Line services with the Merseyrail City Line and main line services from Lime Street. The reopened line passed under the West Coast Main Line Liverpool branch at Allerton but needed to cross the southern Manchester line via Warrington on the flat, which affected capacity.

Rock Ferry to Hooton, Chester and Ellesmere Port
Rock Ferry railway station had been a terminus for Wirral Line services since the Mersey Railway was extended there from Green Lane in 1891. Passengers for the lines to Chester and Helsby would change trains at this station from the electric service on to mainline services operated by steam and diesel. Rock Ferry became one of the terminals for the Merseyrail Wirral Line. In 1985 the line from Rock Ferry to Hooton was electrified and incorporated in the Wirral Line of Merseyrail, Hooton thus becoming a new terminus.

Hooton is a junction station where the line to Helsby via Ellesmere Port branches off the main Chester line. The line from Hooton to Chester was electrified in 1993, Chester thus becoming a terminus station of the Wirral Line. The line from Hooton to Ellesmere Port was electrified in 1994 and incorporated into the Wirral Line, Ellesmere Port thus also becoming a terminus and interchange station.

New stations

A programme of new stations on the Merseyrail network expanded the coverage of the system. They are:
  (1983),  (1985),  (1988),  (1995),  (1998),  (1998),  (2017),  (2023)

 opened in 2006 on the site of Holly Park football ground of South Liverpool F.C. in South Liverpool. It is an interchange station between the Merseyrail Northern Line from Liverpool Central to Hunts Cross and the City Line from Liverpool Lime Street to Runcorn and Warrington Central and also mainline services. The station also includes a bus terminal and large car park and has frequent bus services to Liverpool John Lennon Airport. The station was formed from an amalgamation of the four-track Allerton station and the relocation of the Merseyrail Garston Station. Garston station was closed on the opening of the new facility, the first station closure on the Merseyrail network since Liverpool Exchange station in 1977.

Accidents and incidents
On 26 October 2005, a Merseyrail Class 508 train de-railed in a tunnel on the approach to Liverpool Central underground station. All 119 passengers and train crew were evacuated safely; only the guard was injured. The cause was determined to be rail gauge spread caused by poor maintenance.

Two people were injured.

A passenger train had passed the site of the accident less than 5 seconds earlier. Merseyrail was fined £85,000 plus costs of £20,970.15 for offences under the Health and Safety at Work etc. Act 1974.

On 22 October 2011, an intoxicated teenage girl died after falling between the train and platform at James Street station. The train guard was subsequently convicted of her manslaughter by gross negligence and was jailed for five years.

 
On 13 March 2021, a Merseyrail Class 507 train collided with the buffer stop at  station. The cause was found to be that the driver of the train was using a mobile phone whilst driving. The distraction led him to enter the station at nearly three times the permitted speed. He was sacked and prosecuted, pleading guilty in February 2022 to a charge of endangering the safety of people on the railway.

On 28 October 2022, a Merseyrail train derailed on the tracks just outside of Liverpool Central underground station. The train was not in service at the time, and no one was injured. In a statement released by Merseyrail it was stated a train "tripped a safety device that is designed to lead to a controlled derailment"

Future

There have been various suggestions for ways to enlarge the Merseyrail network. In August 2014, Merseytravel gave details of a 30-year plan for the network to be presented to the leaders of the city region.

Some proposals would extend beyond the current Liverpool City Region area, while others would use former existing lines or track beds inside the area. In November 2016 the details of the next phase of the Merseyrail fleet were announced: if trains capable of use beyond the third-rail DC network are selected as replacements, various expansions can be achieved without electrification of the entire new route. The newly acquired Class 777 trains are capable of operating on non-electrified track, drawing this aspiration closer.

In July 2021, the metro-mayor of the Liverpool City Region announced that bi-modal battery electric Class 777 trains will operate on Merseyrail, extending the network. He stated "This capability means they could eventually provide a direct service from as far as Preston and Wrexham."

The Rail Strategy published in 2020 states:

 Other options that could be further developed by funders or stakeholders (to meet connectivity based conditional outputs) following this study could be:
 Extending the Merseyrail network to Shotton (and possibly on to Wrexham);
 Extending the Merseyrail network to Skelmersdale (and possibly on to Wigan Wallgate); and
 Extending the Merseyrail network to Burscough Junction (and possibly on to Preston).

Proposed future stations

Liverpool Baltic station
Liverpool City Region Combined Authority announced in August 2019 that it was planning to use part of a £172million funding package to reopen St James Station in Liverpool City Centre and build a new station at Headbolt Lane, Kirkby.

The former St James railway station, now disused, is located on the corner of St.James' Place and Parliament Street in the Baltic Triangle district, having been closed in 1917. The station is in a deep cutting on the operational crossrail Northern Line tunnel section between Liverpool Central Station and Brunswick Station.

In 2020, a series of investments and land purchases advanced the case for a station at the site of St James in the Baltic Triangle. Part of the Spatial Regeneration Framework for the area includes a new Baltic Triangle railway station.

In April 2022, following a public vote, the new station was official confirmed as Liverpool Baltic station.

Headbolt Lane station
A new station at Headbolt Lane northeast of Kirkby was first proposed in the 1970s.

In August 2019, Liverpool City Region Combined Authority announced that funding is available for the construction of a three platform station. The station will be the terminal of a Northern Line branch, and also an interchange on a Headbolt Lane to Manchester line via Wigan. The platforms will be designed to accommodate any future Merseyrail extension to Skelmersdale. The station will accommodate a 300 space car park and bus interchange. In August 2021 network rail formally applied to Knowsley Borough Council for planning permission for a station.

The Liverpool City Region Combined Authority announced in July 2021 that Class 777 battery-electric trains will serve the new station on opening. The Merseyrail extension from Kirkby to Headbolt Lane will not be electrified.

Vauxhall station
In its 30-year plan of 2014, Merseytravel mentions the possibility of a new station between Moorfields and Sandhills in the Vauxhall area on the Northern Line. A station at this location would serve the under construction Everton F.C. stadium at Bramley-Moore Dock, which is near to the Northern Line.

Tram-trains
In August 2009, it was reported that a new tram-train link to Liverpool John Lennon Airport and a link to Kings Dock from the east of the city had been proposed.
 Liverpool John Lennon Airport: the existing Northern Line and the City Line from Liverpool Lime Street to Liverpool South Parkway are being assessed. From South Parkway the tram-trains would transfer to a new tramway. Merseytravel commissioned a feasibility study into increasing rail links with the airport in 1995 but no further work has been undertaken.
 Kings Dock to Edge Hill: a link from Edge Hill in the east of the city to the Arena at Kings Dock in the city centre was also being considered.

Battery train trials
The Liverpool City Region Combined Authority Long Term Rail Strategy document of October 2017 stated that trials of new Merseyrail battery trains would be undertaken in 2020. The aim was to extend the electric network onto unelectrified track. A number of lines were targeted for electric third rail/battery train trials, for network extension. Merseyrail Class 777 electric trains have the capability to operate on unelectrified track, which otherwise would not be considered for track electrification on cost grounds. The lines chosen for the trials are:
 Ellesmere Port to Helsby: The Liverpool City Region Combined Authority Long Term Rail Strategy document of October 2017 stated on page 37 that a trial of new Merseyrail battery trains will be undertaken in view to incorporate the  stretch of track from Ellesmere Port to Helsby interchange station onto the Merseyrail network. A successful outcome may make Helsby one of the terminals of the Wirral Line replacing Ellesmere Port, with Stanlow and Thornton and Ince and Elton stations brought into the network.
The aim was to make Preston one of the terminals of the Northern Line, with Burscough Junction, Rufford and Croston stations brought onto the Merseyrail network. The document stated, "The potential use of battery powered Merseyrail units may improve the business case. This will be reviewed after the Merseyrail units have been tested for battery operation in 2020."
The Liverpool City Region Combined Authority announced in July 2021 that the trial had been successful. The new units were able to travel up to 20miles on the fitted batteries. This opens up the possibilities of the trains being used to serve other destinations such as Skelmersdale, Wrexham, Warrington and Runcorn.

Extending the network via battery/electrification
Many proposals to electrify lines adding them to the existing Merseyrail network have been proposed over past decades. However, in 2017 the Department for Transport announced that electrification of lines in Britain will only be where necessary with many planned projects cancelled. Bi-modal trains with combinations of battery electric, hydrogen fuel cell and diesel engines are the preferred options.

Merseytravel purchased Class 777 trains incorporating battery electric technology, having conducted trials on sections of unelectrified track with a view to incorporate into Merseyrail. The successful trials will curtail future full electrification of track. To meet the ambitions of the Liverpool City Region's Long Term Rail Strategy, Merseytravel have clear aspirations to extend the network beyond the current Merseyrail boundaries. Locations such as Skelmersdale, Wrexham and Warrington have been targeted. Many of the lines that were proposed over the decades to be electrified are under consideration for battery electric operation.

Kirkby to Wigan

In 1977, the Liverpool to  section of the Liverpool-to-Bolton route was electrified being merged into Merseyrail. Kirkby became the terminus of the Northern Line Kirkby branch. The former through service to Bolton was split into two, with passengers making through journeys having to change at Kirkby from the Merseyrail electric network to the Northern Rail diesel network onwards to Wigan and Bolton.

Electrifying track from Kirkby and extending the Northern Line to Wigan Wallgate was a long-term aspiration of Merseytravel in 2014. The extension was identified by Network Rail as a route where electrification would enable new patterns of passenger services to operate. The aspiration was accelerated in March 2015 with the Electrification Task force placing electrification of the line from Kirkby to Salford Crescent in a Tier 1 priority category.

The line from Kirkby to the Headbolt Lane station will be operated by Class 777 battery trains when the new station is completed.

Ormskirk to Preston

It would re-establish the most direct Liverpool-Preston route which is one of Merseytravel's long-term aspirations. However, in 2008 Network Rail said the benefit-to-cost ratio of the scheme was insufficient to justify this scheme in the near future though the scheme continued to be mentioned by Network Rail. Third rail battery electric train trials were undertaken in 2020 by Merseyrail on this section of track to provide a Liverpool to Preston service.

Bidston to Wrexham

There have been various proposals to electrify some or all of the line over the years, all have been rejected. The current view is to operate battery-electric trains on the line. In March 2015, the introduction of battery powered trains was proposed for the Borderlands line by Network Rail. The Network Rail document proposes using battery powered rolling stock precluding full electrification of the line, also providing a cheaper method of increasing connectivity into the electrified Birkenhead and Liverpool sections of the Wirral Line. From the document:
"In the longer term, potential deployment of rolling stock with the ability to operate on battery power for part of their journey may provide the ability in an affordable manner to improve the service offering between the Wrexham – Bidston route and Liverpool."

KeolisAmey Wales, the former operator of the Wales and Borders franchise, Transport for Wales, announced in 2018 that it was planning to use refurbished Class 230 metro trains using electric motor traction supplied with power by on-board batteries. An on-board diesel generator charges the batteries, with regenerative braking extending the battery's charge. The Vivarail built trains were planned to serve the line between Wrexham and Bidston. These planned new trains have put the full electrification of the line on hold. Welsh Economy Secretary, Ken Skates, stated that the Welsh government were in an advanced stage of talks with Merseytravel about running a direct service from Wrexham to Liverpool. This intent was reinforced in July 2021. Steve Rotheram, the Liverpool City Region metro-mayor, has expressed desires to operate Merseyrail Class 777 battery-electric trains on the Borderlands Line.

Hunts Cross to Warrington

The Strategic Plan for the North West (SPNW) envisaged in 1973 that the Liverpool to Warrington line would be electrified and integrated into the Merseyrail Northern Line by 1991, making Warrington Central a terminus. In March 2015, the Electrification Task force placed electrifying the line from Liverpool to Manchester via Warrington Central in the Tier 1 priority category. The Liverpool City Region's Long Term Rail Strategy has clear aspirations to extend the network to Warrington, using the introduction of the Class 777 trains as an enabler.

Southport to Wigan
 to Wigan has been identified by Network Rail as a route where electrification in conjunction with extension of electrification from Ormskirk to Preston and reinstatement of the Burscough Curves would enable new patterns of passenger service to operate. In March 2015, the Electrification Task force placed the electrifying of the line from Southport to Salford Crescent via Wigan in the Tier 1 priority category.

Ellesmere Port to Helsby

 is an interchange station on the Chester to Warrington Bank Quay and Ellesmere Port to Helsby lines. Merging the line from Ellesmere Port to Helsby into Merseyrail would create a Liverpool to Helsby service, giving a smooth interchange from Merseyrail to all stations on the Chester to Warrington line. The  to Helsby route is included in Merseytravel's rail strategy as a "long-term aspiration". Third rail battery electric train trials were undertaken in 2020 by Merseyrail on this section of track using the new Class 777 trains. The results may indicate that the network can be expanded to Helsby without further electrification.

Other battery electric extensions

Liverpool City Region metro-mayor Steve Rotheram stated that the City Region is planning to extend the network "so it reaches communities right across our city region and beyond". The Liverpool City Region map displays desired extensions of Merseyrail including a Chester to Runcorn East line. This line would operate on a section of the Chester to Warrington Bank Quay line, incorporating the Helsby interchange station. The Integrated Rail Plan proposes a new station at the next station, Warrington Bank Quay low-level. The new station will serve HS2 and Northern Powerhouse Rail expanding the interchange.

Reopening lines and track

Burscough Curves
The Burscough Curves were short chords linking the Ormskirk to Preston Line with the Manchester to Southport Line. The curves allowed northbound trains from Ormskirk to run directly to Southport to the west, and southbound trains from Preston to run west to Southport. The last regular passenger trains ran over the curves in 1962; the tracks were subsequently lifted. The reinstatement of the Burscough Curves would allow direct Preston-Southport & Ormskirk-Southport services providing an option of an alternative Liverpool-Southport route via Ormskirk. Network Rail has recommended that a strategy for the Burscough Curves be developed further.

In a parliamentary debate on 27 April 2011, the Burscough Curves were a prime point of the debate. The transport minister wished to meet former Southport MP John Pugh regarding the reinstatement of the curves. The latest refresh of Merseytravel's Long Term Strategy puts the opening of the curves in Network Rail's CP7 period.

The new Class 777 Merseyrail trains have been tested for battery electric operation, with the prospect of using them on the Burscough Curves open to review. Battery train introduction on the Merseyrail network may improve the business case to reopen the Burscough Curves, allowing Northern Line trains to travel from Ormskirk to Southport, giving two routes from Liverpool to Southport. If realised Burscough Junction, Burscough Bridge, New Lane, Bescar Lane and Meols Cop stations may be incorporated into Merseyrail.

Edge Hill to Bootle

Known as either the Canada Dock Branch line or the Bootle Branch line, this is an unelectrified line running from Edge Hill Junction in the east of the city in a long curve to the container terminal to the north of the city. The line's last passenger trains were withdrawn in 1977. Being the only line currently into Liverpool docks, freight to Seaforth Container Terminal ensures constant use.

Network Rail investigated options for the Canada Dock Branch in its March 2009 Route Utilisation Strategy for Merseyside and concluded that the expected benefits did not justify the investment in new infrastructure.

The Department for Transport's rail electrification document of July 2009 stated that the route to Liverpool Docks would be electrified via overhead wires. The Canada Dock Branch Line is the only line into the docks. From the document:

70. Electrification of this route will offer electric haulage options for freight.
There will be an alternative route to Liverpool docks for electrically-operated freight trains, and better opportunities of electrified access to the proposed freight terminal at Parkside near Newton-le-Willows.

The document states "route to Liverpool docks for electrically-operated freight trains", which is the Bootle Branch line being the only line into Liverpool docks. However, the initial phases of electrification scheduled until 2016 do not list this line. This delay may impede the efficiency of Liverpool docks container terminal which is being extended to accommodate the largest post-Panamax container ships increasing container throughput of the terminal by 25%, entailing increased usage of the line. Local residents are campaigning to have the majority of containers to be transported by rail easing road congestion and pollution, which may increase rail traffic even further. This delay in electrification may delay any proposed passenger use for the line.

The Liverpool City Region Combined Authority Long Term Rail Strategy document of October 2017, page 37, states:
A long term proposal which will need to be considered alongside the developing freight strategy for the region and the expansion of the Port of Liverpool. The proposal envisages the introduction of passenger services which will operate from the Bootle Branch into Lime Street. An initial study is required to understand fully the freight requirements for the line and what the realistic potential for operating passenger services over the line is.

It was announced in December 2019 that Liverpool City Council had commissioned a feasibility study to see about reopening the Canada Dock Branch to passenger traffic.

North Mersey Branch
The North Mersey Branch from Bootle to Aintree is currently used only by engineering trains to gain access to Merseyrail tracks; however, Merseytravel has long-term goals to reopen and electrify the line. The line was considered in the Merseyside Route Utilisation Strategy document, concluding that reopening could not yet be recommended. However, the Route Utilisation Strategy document went on to state:

The possibility of running passenger trains along the North Mersey and Bootle branches was examined by the RUS and cannot yet be recommended. However, future development and regeneration could lead to increased demand for such services. Any such passenger services would need to be implemented in a way that ensures current and future freight demand can be accommodated. There is also a possibility in the longer term of using other infrastructure, including the disused Wapping and Waterloo tunnels, to provide new journey opportunities.

Skelmersdale Branch

Skelmersdale lost its rail passenger service in 1956. The village was expanded into a new town from the 1960s. A number of proposals over the years have been put forward to connect Skelmersdale to the Merseyrail network.

In June 2009, the Association of Train Operating Companies called for the reopening of the line from Ormskirk to Skelmersdale as part of a £500million scheme to open 33 stations on 14 lines closed in the Beeching Axe. The report proposed extending the line from Ormskirk railway station by laying  of new single track along the previous route towards Rainford Junction, at a cost estimated to be in the region of £31million.

In December 2012, Merseytravel commissioned Network Rail to study route options and costs of connecting to Skelmersdale with Merseytravel contributing £50,000 and West Lancashire Council contributing £100,000. In 2014, the reopening of a section of the Skelmersdale Branch from Upholland to Skelmersdale town centre was proposed. In January 2017, Lancashire County Council announced that the preferred site for the railway terminal station was the former Glenburn Sports College and Skelmersdale College's West Bank Campus.

In the Liverpool City Region Combined Authority Long Term Rail Strategy document of October 2017, it was stated that Merseytravel was working with Lancashire County Council and Network Rail to develop a plan to extend the Merseyrail network from Kirkby through to Skelmersdale with third rail electrification under consideration. The government gave assurances in April 2020 that the Skelemersdale link would be constructed. However, the Department for Transport announced in July 2022 that it was rejecting the Strategic Outline Business Case, throwing the scheme into doubt. The DfT instead suggested that better bus links with the Kirkby–Wigan rail line would be a cheaper way of improving connectivity for Skelmersdale.

Outer Rail Loop

The Orbital Outer Rail Loop was a part of the initial Merseyrail plans of the 1970s. The route circled the outer fringes of the city of Liverpool using primarily existing rail lines merged to create the loop. Liverpool city has a semi-circular footprint with the city centre at the western fringe against the River Mersey. The western section of the loop would parallel the river running through the city centre. The scheme was started along with the creation of Merseyrail however postponed due to cost cutting, with only the western section of the loop completed being a part of the current Northern Line.

The concept of using the former Cheshire Lines Committee's North Liverpool Extension Line route through the eastern suburbs of Liverpool as the eastern section of a rapid-transit orbital route circling the outskirts of the city first emerged before the Second World War. The proposal was for a 'belt' line using the now demolished Liverpool Overhead Railway, which ran along the river front, as its western section. In the 1960s during the planning for Merseyrail, this was developed into the Outer Rail Loop scheme - an electric rapid-transit passenger line circling the outer districts of the city by using a combination of newly electrified existing lines and a new link tunnel under the city centre merging lines to the north and south of the city centre completing the loop.

A feature was that passengers on the mainline radial routes into Lime Street from the east and south could transfer onto the Outer Loop at two parkway interchange stations completing their journey to Liverpool suburbs avoiding the need to travel into the city centre, which would also relieve pressure on Lime Street station. Liverpool South Parkway was one of these stations opening thirty years after the initial proposal. The Outer Loop would have connected the eastern suburbs of the city: Gateacre, Childwall, Broad Green, Knotty Ash, West Derby, Clubmoor and Walton with the city centre.

As finally developed, the Outer Loop consisted of two sub-loops - a loop serving the northern suburbs and one the southern suburbs with both running through to the city centre from the east. The sub-loops allowed more direct journeys into the city centre from the eastern suburbs giving the overall scheme greater viability.

The eastern section of the Outer Rail Loop project was cancelled in the late 1970s because of delays and cost overruns on the Loop (Wirral Line) and Link (Northern Line) projects and local political opposition. Only the western section of the loop was built. The project was abandoned as a working proposal by Merseytravel in the 1980s. Much expense was incurred in constructing a large bridge taking the M62 motorway over the eastern section and the construction of header tunnels south of Liverpool Central station. The route is still largely intact, complete with bridges, although now the eastern section mainly forms the Liverpool Loop Country Park - a walking and cycling trail through the suburbs.

The key components of the Loop were as follows:

West Section - The existing Merseyrail Electrics Northern Line from Sandhills in the north (later Aintree on the Ormskirk branch) to Hunts Cross. This section includes the most expensive part of the Outer Rail Loop - the Link Line tunnel under Liverpool city centre - and the reopened and electrified line from Liverpool Central to Hunts Cross.
East Section - The former Cheshire Lines Committee North Liverpool Extension Line initially from Hunts Cross to Walton however amended to Aintree. This is now the Country Park.
North Section - Originally the Cheshire Lines Committee line from Walton to Kirkdale via the Breeze Hill tunnel. In later versions of the scheme the North Mersey Branch from Aintree to Bootle was substituted. The latter is still intact although only used by maintenance trains whilst the former is now partially built over.
Central Section - The central section from Central station to Broad Green in the east of the city, was a later addition to the plan effectively dividing the loop into two sub-loops, one north, one south. City centre access for the towns east of the Liverpool City Region was provided. This included the unrealised Edge Hill Spur scheme from Liverpool Central underground station to Edge Hill using the Waterloo Tunnel and a section of the City Line from Edge Hill to Broad Green. A major junction was to have been formed with the eastern section of the Outer Loop with a six platform underground station to be named Rocket under the car park of the Rocket pub near the M62/Queens Drive road junction.

The Outer Rail Loop would have been double track throughout, using the electrified 750VDC third rail system of the Merseyrail Electrics network.

Although no official proposals have been made to revive the scheme in recent years, the route is effectively safeguarded with periodic calls being made by local politicians for the revival of the complete project or just the short stretch of route from Hunts Cross to Gateacre. The Gateacre service was the last to operate out of the former Liverpool Central High Level Station prior to its closure in 1972.

Since the postponement of the project, a number of Route Utilisation Strategy documents have mentioned reopening the North Mersey Branch line, the northern section of the loop, to form a passenger link between Bootle and Aintree with stations to serve Ford and Girobank.

Edge Hill Spur (reusing tunnels)

In the 1960s and early 1970s, the Edge Hill Spur scheme was proposed to link the east of the city with the central underground section. It would have extended the Merseyrail underground network from Liverpool Central Station to Edge Hill Station using existing freight tunnels. The scheme was dropped, but a junction and two headers tunnels were built south of Central station to facilitate future construction of the Spur during the construction of the Northern Line tunnel.

The construction of the Spur would have connected the City Line branches to the east of Liverpool into the electrified Merseyrail network and importantly the underground section in Liverpool's city centre. An increase in integration and connectivity of the network would have been achieved. The Spur would have also formed the central section of the proposed Outer Rail Loop splitting the loop into two smaller loops (see Outer Loop section). An additional and substantial benefit was diverting local urban trains entering the city from the east underground in the city centre. This would release platform space at Lime Street mainline terminus station for the use of only mid and long-haul mainline routes.

The initial and cheaper proposal was to re-use the 1829 Wapping freight tunnel, by means of two new single-track tunnels branched off the Northern Line tunnel at a new junction named Liverpool Central South Junction, south of Central Station. The Wapping Tunnel would have given access to Edge Hill via the historic Cavendish cutting, built for the 1830 Liverpool and Manchester Railway. Access to the City Line would have been obtained via a flyover to the east of Edge Hill Station over the main lines from Lime Street. This flyover has since been demolished.

In the early 1970s, Liverpool City Council planners proposed an alternative scheme, which was subsequently adopted. This revised route would permit a new underground station to be constructed to serve Liverpool University, behind the Student's Union building in Mount Pleasant. It would extend the two connecting tunnels from Central Station in a large radius curve to the north, passing beneath the mainline Lime Street station approach cutting and accessing Edge Hill via a section of the Waterloo/Victoria Tunnel. On emerging from this tunnel at the existing Edge Hill Station, the route would be on the north side of the main lines thereby removing the need for a flyover.

Although powers were obtained to build this line under the 1975 Merseyside Metropolitan Railway Act, construction was postponed due to the financial cutbacks and political opposition that also halted the Outer Rail Loop project. The east of Liverpool has suffered in many aspects ever since. An attempt was made to revive the project in the mid-1980s but it was found to be not financially viable.

Following the collapse of the Merseytram scheme in 2006, proposals were considered to revive the project, with the route of the tunnels currently safeguarded. Further references are made to the scheme, as a future option, in MerseyTravel's 30-year plan.

A further proposal to resurrect the Edge Hill spur scheme with a new station at Paddington Village was revealed in 2016 by the then Liverpool mayor Joe Anderson, as part of a scheme to extend Liverpool's Knowledge Quarter onto the site of the former Archbishop Blanche School. A feasibility study to reopen the Wapping Tunnel was commissioned and delivered in May 2016. The report found that the Wapping Tunnel was in good condition though suffered from flooding in places and would require some remedial work, but that the concept of reopening the tunnel was viable.

See also
 List of underground stations of the Merseyrail network

Notes

References

Further reading

External links

 
 New Class 777 train microsite by Merseytravel

British Rail brands
Regional rail in the United Kingdom
Electric railways in the United Kingdom
750 V DC railway electrification
Nederlandse Spoorwegen
Railway companies established in 2003
Rail transport in Merseyside
Train operating companies in the United Kingdom
2003 establishments in England
Underground commuter rail